Sarah Johns (born 1979) is an American country music artist. Signed to BNA Records in 2006, she released her debut album Big Love in a Small Town, which accounted for two charting singles on the Billboard Hot Country Songs charts, including the No. 39 "The One in the Middle."

Musical career
Sarah Johns was born in Pollard, Kentucky. She began singing regularly while attending the University of Kentucky.

In early 2006, Sarah Johns signed to Show Dog Nashville (now Show Dog-Universal Music), a record label owned by Toby Keith. Although she toured with Keith on his Big Throwdown 2 tour, she did not release anything on Show Dog, and left the label that April. A year later, Johns signed with BNA Records. She released her debut single "The One in the Middle" on April 30, 2007 and made Top 40 on the Billboard Hot Country Songs charts with it. On June 2, 2007, Johns made her debut on the Grand Ole Opry. Johns' debut album, Big Love in a Small Town, was released on August 28, 2007 and peaked at No. 198 on the Billboard 200. Allmusic critic Thom Jurek rated the album three stars out of five, comparing Johns' song choices and attitudes to those of Tammy Wynette and Gretchen Wilson and saying, "This record isn't all the way there, but it's well on the way and might blow up the charts anyway. Big Love in a Small Town is an auspicious debut by a young talent." Its second single, "He Hates Me", peaked at No. 47 on the country charts.

Discography

Big Love in a Small Town (2007)

Track listing

Album chart positions

Singles

References

American women country singers
American country singer-songwriters
BNA Records artists
Country musicians from Kentucky
Living people
1979 births
Singer-songwriters from Kentucky
Kentucky women musicians
Singers from Kentucky
21st-century American singers
21st-century American women singers